Alexis Barrault (1812–1865) was a French engineer who designed The Palais de l'Industrie (Palace of Industry), an exhibition hall located between the Seine River and the Champs-Élysées which was erected for the Paris World Fair in 1855.

Notes

1796 births
1863 deaths
19th-century French engineers